Glaoui Palace may refer to several palaces used by the Glaoui family in Morocco:
 Dar el Bacha, the palace of the Glaouis in Marrakesh
 Dar Glaoui, the palace of the Glaouis in Fez
 Telouet Kasbah, the palace of the Glaouis in the High Atlas mountains
 Kasbah Taourirt, an older palace used by the Glaouis in Ouarzazate